Space Probe Taurus (a.k.a. Space Monster) is a 1965 low budget black-and-white  science fiction/action/drama film from American International Pictures, written and directed by Leonard Katzman, and starring Francine York, James E. Brown, Baynes Barrow, and Russ Fender.

Plot
In the late 20th century, when manned missions to outer space have become routine, a distress call from the spaceship Faith One requests its immediate destruction. It has been contaminated by an infectious gas, leaving all crew dead except for its commander (Bob Legionaire). The mission is aborted and the spaceship is destroyed.

By 2000, a new propulsion technology has been developed. Four astronauts aboard the spaceship Hope One set off to find new planets for colonization. Their mission takes them past a space platform circling Earth. General Mark Tillman (James Macklin) at Earth Control HQ tells a TV reporter (John Willis) that all is going according to the pre-flight plan.

The crew of gravity-controlled Hope One consists of the pilot/commanding officer, Colonel Hank Stevens (James Brown), and three scientists: Dr. John Andros (Baynes Barron), Dr. Paul Martin (Russ Bender), and Dr. Lisa Wayne (Francine York). It is quickly revealed that Stevens did not want a woman on the mission, but he is stuck with Dr. Wayne anyway.

Not long into their voyage, Hope One comes upon an unknown spacecraft. Earth Control instructs them to investigate and they encounter a grotesque alien. The alien attacks Dr. Andros, forcing Stevens to shoot and kill it. Then, radiation levels rise on the alien spacecraft, so Stevens sets a bomb to blow it up.

After a fiery meteorite storm leads to an emergency landing in the ocean of an Earth-like escaped moon, Tillman takes time to apologize to Wayne for his sexist remarks, which results in a quick reconciliation and a more-than-friendly kiss. While repairs continue, giant crabs take an interest in the spaceship. The crew decides to test the atmosphere to see if it contains breathable air, which it does. Then, Andros volunteers to go scout the nearest land mass. A sea monster almost intercepts him, but the scientist reaches shore, while his comrades continue repairs and worry about him. Upon his return, Andros is again attacked by the sea monster and, after making it back safely to the spaceship, perishes after confirming that the planet can support human life and plants can grow. The crew confirms this to Earth, names the planet Andros One, and rockets back safely to Earth.

Cast
 Francine York as Dr. Lisa Wayne
 James Brown as Col. Hank Stevens 
 Baynes Barron as Dr. John Andros
 Russ Bender as Dr. Paul Martin
 John Willis as TV Reporter
 Bob  as Faith I Crewman 
 James Macklin as Gen. Mark Tilman
 Phyllis Selznick as Earth Control Secretary
 John Lomma as Earth Control

References

External links
 
 

1965 films
1960s science fiction films
American science fiction action films
American space adventure films
Films about astronauts
Films set in 2000
Films set in the future
Films produced by Burt Topper
American International Pictures films
1960s English-language films
1960s American films